Đerzelez Alija or Gjergj Elez Alia is a legendary character found in the epic poetry and literature of Bosnia and Herzegovina, Gora, Kosovo and northern Albania. He is one of the well known legendary heroes and a symbol of brotherly loyalty to both the Bosniaks and Albanians.

Name

The name Gürz is derived from the Turkish word gürzi (mace) and means warrior with the mace.

The name Gjergj is the Albanian rendering of George, which is pronounced by Bosniaks the same way as in Albanian, but spelled as Đerđ/Djerdj in Bosnian. The name Gjergjelez have been explained as a compund of Gjergj and Elez, the latter corresponding to the name of the prophet Iliaz (Elias). The tripartite-compound names such as the case of Gjergj Elez Alia are typically found in northern Albanian tribes as well as in some southern Albanian mountain peoples. The third part of the compound name, Ali, is an Ottoman Turkish name of Arabic origin, meaning "high, noble", which is used to highlight a peculiar trait of this legendary charachter.

Historical background 
It is believed that epic figure of Đerzelez Alija was inspired by Ali Bey Mihaloglu or Gürz Ilyas, an Ottoman military commander in 15th century and the first sanjakbey of the Sanjak of Smederevo. According to Ottoman census of 1485 he was in charge for nahiya of Dobrun near Višegrad as his timar (land grant). There is a turbe (mausoleum) in the village of Gerzovo (near Mrkonjić Grad, Bosnia and Herzegovina) which according to legend is his burial place.

The first written record of the epic figure of Đerzelez (in the form of "Ali-beg") was a form of South Slavic bugarštica (long form epic and ballad poem), The Marriage of Vuk the Dragon-Despot, recorded by Đuro Matei at the end of 17th or beginning of 18th century. In songs recorded in the Erlangen Manuscript, Đerzelez is mentioned in the form of "Turk elder Balibeg".

Đerzelez Alija was a popular Muslim epic hero of the Bosnian Krajina (frontier region) from the end of 15th century. He is one of the well known legendary heroes and a symbol of brotherly loyalty to both the Bosniaks and Albanians.

In Bosnian tradition 

Ottoman historian and chronicler Ibn Kemal (1468–1534) wrote about his popularity in folk songs in Bosnia.

Some of the poems which include the name of Đerzelez in their titles are:

| width="50%" align="left" valign="top" style="border:0"|
 Đerđelez Alija, the Emperor's Champion
 Đerđelez Alija i Vuk Despotović
 Marko Kraljević i Đerzelez Alija (Marko Kralyević and Djerzelez Aliya)
 Banović Sekul i Đerđelez Alija
 Oblačić Rade i Đerđelez Alija
 Đerđelez Alija i Starina Novak
 Đerđelez Alija deli mejdan sa Sibinjanin Jankom
 Ženidba Đerđelez Alije
 Sedam kralja traže glavu Đerđelez Alije
 Junaštvo Đerđelez Alije
| width="50%" align="left" valign="top" style="border:0"|
 Đerđelez Alija i tri gorska hajduka
 Vuk Jajčanin i Đerđelez Alija
 Komlen kapetan traži glavu Đerđelez Alije
 Đerđelez Alija i ban od Karlova
 Zadarski ban i Đerđelez Alija
 Smrt Đerđelez Alije
 Đerđelez Alija ide u Toku
 Tokalija kralj traži glavu Đerđelez Alije
 Đerzelezovo bolovanje
 Otkud je Đerđelez

Đerzelez is one of the main characters of many other poems without his name in their title, like:
 Porča of Avala and Vuk the Fiery Dragon
 The Marriage of Vuk the Dragon-Despot

According to the legend, Đerzelez also has an epic horse (sometimes called Šarac, as the horse of Marko) and he is a good friend of fairies who help him when he is in danger. Legend says that he was killed during his prayer (salat) because he did not want to interrupt it despite being aware that he would be killed.

In Albanian tradition 

 
In Albanian folklore, Gjergj Elez Alia is regarded as a great warrior and his legend is one of the most popular. A song of Gjergj Elez Alia was recorded by Bernardin Palaj and Donat Kurti in Nikaj (Tropojë District) and published in Tirana in 1937. The song is usually sung accompanied by the lahuta (gusle), or occasionally with çifteli, by the rapsod (performer of epic poetry). The song of Gjergj Elez Alia is part of the heroic non-historical cycle of Albanian epic poetry, the Kângë Kreshnikësh ("Songs of Heroes"), however it is not related to the epic cycle of the pair of heroic brothers Muji and Halili.

Legacy 

Ivo Andrić, the 1961 winner of the Nobel Prize in literature, wrote Put Alije Đerzeleza, published in 1920, after two fragments (Djerzelez at the Inn and Djerzelez on the Road) were published in 1918 and 1919.

One of the oldest houses in Sarajevo, "The House of Alija Đerzelez", is named after him. There are streets in several towns in Bosnia and Herzegovina (Bihać, Gračanica, Zenica, etc.) named after him.

References

Sources

Further reading

Legendary Bosnia and Herzegovina people
Bosniak culture
Legendary people from the Ottoman Empire
Ottoman period in the history of Bosnia and Herzegovina
Characters in Albanian epic poetry
Characters in Bosnia and Herzegovina epic poetry